Poul William Anderson (November 25, 1926 – July 31, 2001) was an American fantasy and science fiction author who was active from the 1940s until the 21st century. Anderson also wrote historical novels. His awards include seven Hugo Awards and three Nebula Awards.

Biography 
Poul Anderson was born on November 25, 1926, in Bristol, Pennsylvania to Scandinavian parents. Soon after his birth, his father, Anton Anderson relocated the family to Texas, where they lived for more than ten years. After Anton Anderson's death, his widow took the children to Denmark. The family returned to the United States after the beginning of World War II, settling eventually on a Minnesota farm.

While he was an undergraduate student at the University of Minnesota, Anderson's first stories were published by editor John W. Campbell in the magazine Astounding Science Fiction: "Tomorrow's Children" by Anderson and F. N. Waldrop in March 1947 and a sequel, "Chain of Logic" by Anderson alone, in July. He earned his BA in physics with honors but became a freelance writer after he graduated in 1948. His third story was printed in the December Astounding.

Anderson married Karen Kruse in 1953 and relocated with her to the San Francisco Bay area. Their daughter Astrid (later married to science fiction author Greg Bear) was born in 1954. They made their home in Orinda, California. Over the years Poul gave many readings at The Other Change of Hobbit bookstore in Berkeley; his widow later donated his typewriter and desk to the store.

In 1954, he published the fantasy novel The Broken Sword, one of his most known works.

In 1965, Algis Budrys said that Anderson "has for some time been science fiction's best storyteller". He was a founding member of the Society for Creative Anachronism (SCA) in 1966 and of the Swordsmen and Sorcerers' Guild of America (SAGA), also during the mid-1960s. The latter was a group of Heroic fantasy authors organized by Lin Carter, originally eight in number, with entry by credentials as a fantasy writer alone. Anderson was the sixth President of the Science Fiction and Fantasy Writers of America, taking office in 1972.

Robert A. Heinlein dedicated his 1985 novel The Cat Who Walks Through Walls to Anderson and eight of the other members of the Citizens' Advisory Council on National Space Policy. The Science Fiction Writers of America made Anderson its 16th SFWA Grand Master in 1998 and in 2000's fifth class, he was inducted into the Science Fiction and Fantasy Hall of Fame as one of two deceased and two living writers. He died of prostate cancer on July 31, 2001, after a month in the hospital. A few of his novels were first published posthumously.

Awards and honors
 Gandalf Grand Master of Fantasy (1978)
 Hugo Award (seven times)
 John W. Campbell Memorial Award (2000)
 Inkpot Award (1986)
 Locus Award (41 nominations; one win, 1972)
 Mythopoeic Fantasy Award (one win (1975))
 Nebula Award (three times)
 Pegasus Award (best adaptation, with Anne Passovoy) (1998)
 Prometheus Award (five times, including Special Prometheus Award for Lifetime Achievement in 2001)
 SFWA Grand Master (1997)
 Science Fiction and Fantasy Hall of Fame (2000)
 Asteroid 7758 Poulanderson, discovered by Eleanor Helin at Palomar in 1990, was named in his honor. The official  was published by the Minor Planet Center shortly after his death on September 2, 2001.

Bibliography

See also

Explanatory notes

References

Sources

External links

 Bio, bibliography and book covers at FantasticFiction
 Obituary and tributes from the SFWA
 Poul Anderson Appreciation, by Dr. Paul Shackley
 Poul Anderson, an essay by William Tenn
 The Society for Creative Anachronism, of which Poul Anderson was a founding member
 The King of Ys review at FantasyLiterature.net 
 
 
 
 
 

 By Poul Anderson
 
 
 
 
 
 On Thud and Blunder, an essay by Anderson on fantasy fiction, from the SFWA
 Poul Anderson's online fiction at Free Speculative Fiction Online
 SFWA directory of literary estates

 
1926 births
2001 deaths
20th-century American male writers
20th-century American novelists
21st-century American novelists
American alternate history writers
American fantasy writers
American libertarians
American male novelists
American people of Danish descent
American science fiction writers
Analog Science Fiction and Fact people
Caedmon Records artists
Conan the Barbarian novelists
Filkers
Hugo Award-winning writers
Inkpot Award winners
Nebula Award winners
Novelists from Pennsylvania
People from Bristol, Pennsylvania
People from Orinda, California
Pulp fiction writers
Science Fiction Hall of Fame inductees
SFWA Grand Masters
Society for Creative Anachronism
University of Minnesota alumni
Writers from the San Francisco Bay Area
21st-century American male writers